Route 21 is a  state highway in rural northeastern Connecticut. It extends from Route 12 in Killingly to Route 193 in Thompson. It serves as an alternate to Route 12 in the town of Putnam.

Route description 

Route 21 begins as Thompson Pike at an intersection with Route 12 in northern Killingly and heads north towards the town of Putnam. It crosses into the village of Putnam Heights in the town of Putnam about  later, becoming known as Liberty Highway. Route 21 runs through the rural areas of Putnam as it heads north towards the town of Thompson. In Thompson, Route 21 becomes known as County Home Road. It passes by the Quinnatisset Country Club, crossing over the Quinnatisset Brook along the way. Route 21 ends a mile later at an intersection with Route 193 in Thompson center. Route 21 is two lanes wide and is classified as a collector road for its entire length. It carries traffic volumes of up to 2,100 per day.

History 

Route 21 was established in 1944 between US 44 and Route 12 to serve the village of Putnam Heights. It was extended north from US 44 to Route 193 in 1957 to provide access to the Quinnatisset Country Club.

Junction list

References

External links

021
Transportation in Windham County, Connecticut